In Nacht und Eis (English: "In Night and Ice"), also called Der Untergang der Titanic ("The Sinking of the Titanic") and Shipwrecked in Icebergs in the US, is a 1912 German silent adventure-disaster drama film about the sinking of RMS Titanic. This is the earliest surviving film about the Titanic disaster.

Plot
The film starts out with the passengers boarding at Southampton. The lives of the passengers on board the ill-fated ocean liner are depicted. On 14 April, Titanic strikes an iceberg, throwing the diners in the Café Parisien to the side. Panic strikes the passengers. The crew ready the lifeboats, despite the fact that there are not enough of them. Women and children are loaded, while the men are held back. The radio operators (who take up most of the sinking part of the film) send out an SOS. Fire blows out of the funnels during the sinking and then the boilers explode. The ship's band is repeatedly shown playing musical pieces, the titles of which are shown on captions; the hymn, "Nearer, My God, to Thee" is played. As the radio room floods, the Captain calls out to the passengers, "Be British!" and finally the Captain releases the operators from their duty but both are willing to remain on the ship. As Titanic sinks, the captain saves a drowning man and takes him to a lifeboat but he refuses a spot and declares he will follow his ship, swims away and the waves close over the swimming captain, as his cap floats in the water.

Production
The film was produced by Continental-Kunstfilm of Berlin, and directed by the Romanian Mime Misu. While most of its footage was shot in a glasshouse studio in the rear courtyard of the offices at 123 Chausseestrasse, some footage was shot in Hamburg, and some was possibly done aboard the German ocean liner Kaiserin Auguste Victoria, then docked at Hamburg. The Café Parisien scenes were filmed in the vessel's Winter Garden. The Berlin Fire Department provided water to use for the sinking scenes. The filming began in May 1912, and the film premiered in August 1912. The Captain and First Officer are played by Otto Rippert and Ernst Rückert respectively.

With a running time of 35 minutes, In Nacht und Eis was three times longer than the average film of 1912. Shot in black and white, various scenes were tinted to heighten their impact, such as night scenes in dark blue and a shot of a stoker feeding a burner in red.

In one scene, a title card reads: Der kleine Milliardenerbe, welcher mit seinem Kindermädchen gerettet wurde, weil sich die ganze Familie opferte, um den Namen zu erhalten which translates to "The little inheritor of billions, who was rescued by his nanny to preserve the [family] name, since the whole family sacrificed themselves." This related to the true story of the Allison family which were traveling in First Class, whose baby Trevor escaped the Titanic with his nanny Alice, while his family perished in the sinking.

Preservation status
The film was presumed lost until February 1998, when the German film archivist Horst Lange, after seeing a newspaper article mentioning the disappearance of In Nacht und Eis, informed the paper that he possessed a print of the film. Various scenes can be seen in the documentary Beyond Titanic. The movie itself is available to view in its entirety on YouTube.

See also
 List of rediscovered films
 List of films about the RMS Titanic

References

External links

1912 films
German black-and-white films
German disaster films
Films of the German Empire
German silent short films
Films about RMS Titanic
1910s rediscovered films
1910s disaster films
Rediscovered German films
Silent adventure films
1910s German films